Lou DeFilippo (August 28, 1916 – March 5, 2000) was an American football tackle and center. He played for the New York Giants in 1941 and from 1945 to 1947. He died on March 5, 2000, in Miami, Florida.

References

1916 births
2000 deaths
American football tackles
American football centers
Fordham Rams football players
New York Giants players
Baltimore Colts coaches
Fordham Rams football coaches
Purdue Boilermakers football coaches
Columbia Lions football coaches
Yale Bulldogs football coaches